EMM may refer to:

People 
 EMM (musical artist), Emma “EMM” Norris, American musical artist
 Colin Emm (1932–2012), pseudonym of Richard Dawson, British-American comedian and actor
 Emm Gryner (born 1975), Canadian singer-songwriter
 Michael Emm (born 1968) Canadian politician

Other uses 
 EMM (psychedelic), a drug
 Eastern Mennonite Missions, an American Christian mission agency
 E-learning maturity model
 Electronic Music Midwest, an American music festival
 Emm Brook, a river in Berkshire, England
 Enterprise mobility management
 Kemmerer Municipal Airport, in Wyoming, United States
 Mamulique language
 Oracle Enterprise Metadata Manager
 Emirates Mars Mission also called Hope or Al-Amal, an UAE robotic mission to Mars